Will Wilkinson (born 1973) is an American writer. He was born in Independence, Missouri, and grew up in Marshalltown, Iowa. He graduated from the University of Northern Iowa in 1995, received an M.A. in philosophy from Northern Illinois University in 1998, and worked toward a Ph.D. at the University of Maryland. In 2009 Wilkinson gained Canadian citizenship via his father, a Canadian immigrant in America, whose Canadian citizenship was reinstated following a change in Canadian emigration law.

Wilkinson was vice president of policy at the Niskanen Center from 2015 until he was fired in January 2021 for tweeting, "If Biden really wanted unity, he’d lynch Mike Pence," which he later apologized for. Wilkinson launched a Substack newsletter titled Model Citizen following his firing. Wilkinson subsequently appeared on two New York Times podcasts, The Argument and the Ezra Klein Show podcast to discuss his experience.

Prior to joining the Niskanen Center in 2015, Wilkinson was U.S. politics correspondent for The Economist. From 2004 to 2010, he was a research fellow at the Cato Institute. Wilkinson was also the managing editor of the Cato Institute's monthly web magazine, Cato Unbound.

His political philosophy has been described by The American Conservative magazine as "Rawlsekian"; that is, a mixture of John Rawls's principles and Friedrich von Hayek's methods. Wilkinson formerly described his political views as libertarian, but he now rejects that label.

Notes

1973 births
21st-century American male writers
21st-century American non-fiction writers
American online publication editors
American people of Canadian descent
American libertarians
Cato Institute people
Living people
Northern Illinois University alumni
People from Marshalltown, Iowa
People with acquired Canadian citizenship
University of Houston alumni
University of Northern Iowa alumni
Writers from Iowa
Writers from Missouri